"Could You Put Your Light On, Please" is a song written and performed by Harry Chapin. The song was included on his 1972 album, Heads & Tales. It has also been included on numerous posthumous compilation albums.

Different Versions
In 2004, a double album called Heads & Tales/Sniper and Other Love Songs was released. It features the full albums with some unreleased tracks. This song was included and showed an unreleased version.

Charts

Weekly charts

Other Uses
In 1973, Arthur Fiedler and The Boston Pops released an orchestral cover of this song. This was anthologized on the 2007 release Arthur Fiedler Legacy: From Fabulous Broadway to Hollywood's Reel Thing on the Deutsche Grammophon label.

References

1972 songs
Elektra Records singles
Harry Chapin songs
Songs written by Harry Chapin